The Ontario English Catholic Teachers' Association (OECTA) is a trade union that represents teachers in publicly funded Roman Catholic schools in the Canadian province of Ontario.  It is an affiliated with the Ontario Teachers' Federation, the Canadian Teachers' Federation, the Canadian Labour Congress, and the Ontario Federation of Labour.

OECTA has more than 45,000 members .  Its mandate includes both the support of its members through the promotion of Catholic values, advocacy, collective bargaining, professional development and protection, and advocacy for the common good.

OECTA holds an annual meeting to elect officers, pass resolutions, and to amend its constitution, by-laws, policies, and procedures. The Provincial Executive meets on a monthly basis to administer the association between annual meetings and to coordinate relations with the Ontario Teachers' Federation. A Council of Presidents representing all OECTA units meets three times per year (additionally at the call of the Provincial President) to advise the Provincial Executive, approve the association's bargaining objectives, and set the association's budget.

Presidents

See also

 Association des enseignantes et des enseignants franco-ontariens
 Education in Ontario
 Elementary Teachers' Federation of Ontario
 Ontario Secondary School Teachers' Federation

References

External links

Canadian Labour Congress
Canadian Teachers' Federation
Education trade unions
Trade unions established in 1944
Educational organizations based in Ontario
Catholic trade unions
1944 establishments in Ontario